Michael Anthony Gateley (13 June 1904 – ?) was an Indian field hockey player who competed in the 1928 Summer Olympics.

In 1928 he was a member of the Indian field hockey team, which won the gold medal.

References

External links
 
 Michael Gateley's profile at Sports Reference.com

1904 births
Year of death missing
Olympic field hockey players of India
Field hockey players at the 1928 Summer Olympics
Indian male field hockey players
Olympic gold medalists for India
Anglo-Indian people
Olympic medalists in field hockey
Medalists at the 1928 Summer Olympics
Field hockey players from Delhi